Painless is the second album by English singer Nilüfer Yanya. It was released on 4 March 2022 on ATO Records.

Critical reception

Painless was met with widespread acclaim reviews from critics. Laura Snapes of Pitchfork opined that "Painless excels at a kind of subtle disclosure, relying less on power than it does texture and immaculately sparing detail." Chris Taylor of Line of Best Fit wrote, "crunchy, ethereal, and odd in its harsh beauty, Painless is a record of contradictions that Yanya spectacularly weaves together." In a five-star review The Telegraph proclaimed that the album "should rubber stamp Nilüfer Yanya as a generational star".

Track listing
Track listing and credits are sourced from album liner notes.

Personnel
 Matt Colton – mastering
 Nathan Boddy – mixing
 Lilian Nuthall – mixing assistance
 Nilüfer Yanya – artwork, photography
 Lauren Harewood – design
 Elif Yanya – paintings
 Molly Daniel – photography

Charts

References

2022 albums
ATO Records albums
Nilüfer Yanya albums